Mortimer, North Carolina is a ghost town in Wilson Creek Township, Caldwell County, in the northwestern part of the state.

Once a mill town with a population of around 800, the town flooded in 1940 and was subsequently abandoned. Several remains are existent today, including machinery from the mill and the foundations of several buildings.

References

External links
History of Mortimer and Edgemont, N.C. - Old Photographs and Images of Mortimer and Edgemont
 February 16th 2009 copy of above link from Web Archive.org

Geography of Caldwell County, North Carolina
Ghost towns in North Carolina